This is a list of yearly regular season champions in college football of the National Collegiate Athletic Association (NCAA) FCS Ohio Valley Conference. Fifteen different teams have won a championship in the seven decade history of the OVC; every team that plays in the conference has won at least one conference championship.

Champions by year

† Both the OVC and Tennessee Tech list Tennessee Tech (6–1) as champion, while Western Kentucky (6–1) with a head-to-head victory over Tennessee Tech claims this as a co-championship.

†† Due to the COVID-19 pandemic, the 2020 OVC season was postponed until the Spring of 2021. Some teams played in the Fall. However, all conference games were played as per normal and the champions were crowned on April 11, 2021.

Championships by team

Bold indicates an outright conference championship.

Italics indicates a school no longer competing in the Ohio Valley Conference.

† Claimed as a co-championship by WKU, but not recognized by the Ohio Valley Conference.

Notes

References

Ohio Valley Conference
Champions